Kafran (also Romanized as Kafrān; also known as Kafrūn and Keiron) is a village in Rudasht-e Sharqi Rural District, Bon Rud District, Isfahan County, Isfahan Province, Iran. At the 2006 census, its population was 2,349, in 645 families.

References 

Populated places in Isfahan County